Vernon Islands is an island group in the Northern Territory of Australia.

Vernon Islands may also refer to.

Vernon Islands, Northern Territory, a locality
Vernon Islands Conservation Reserve, a protected area in the Northern Territory

See also
Vernon (disambiguation)
Edward Venables-Vernon-Harcourt